Catorce (Spanish "Fourteen") may refer to:

Geography
Catorce, San Luis Potosí, Mexico
Real de Catorce, village in Mexico
Río Uxpanapa (Poblado Catorce) in Uxpanapa (municipality), Mexico
Catorce de Noviembre, Panama
 La Catorce, area of parish Buena Fe, Ríos Province, Ecuador
"La Catorce", department store in Centro Comercial Llanogrande Plaza, Palmira, Valle del Cauca, Colombia
Catorce de Julio, springs at Sensuntepeque in the Cabañas department of El Salvador
La Catorce, barrio in Puerto Barrios, Guatemala

People
"El Catorce" Victoriano Ramírez Mexican general of the Cristero War

Other
La Catorce, novel by Pedro Mata Domínguez
XHERS-FM, Radio Catorce, S.A.